Euphorbia thouarsiana is a species of plant in the family Euphorbiaceae. It is endemic to Madagascar.  Its natural habitat is subtropical or tropical moist lowland forests. It is threatened by habitat loss.

References

Endemic flora of Madagascar
thouarsiana
Vulnerable plants
Taxonomy articles created by Polbot
Taxa named by Henri Ernest Baillon